Bogra Zilla School is one of the oldest high schools in the Bogra District of Bangladesh and one of the top-ranked schools in the country. It provides education from class three (Grade-3) to class ten (Grade-10). It was a private English medium school before becoming a public school.

History
Bogra Zilla School was established in 1853. Babu Bhagabati Charan Ghosh was the first headmaster. It was a private (non-government) school before becoming a public one. It came under governmental management through the efforts of the magistrate and collector Mr. Russell and deputy collector Babu S. Mukharjee. This school observed its 150th anniversary celebration in 2005.

Bogra Zilla School was the second government high school in the Bogra district during British rule. Babu Bhagabati Charan Ghosh was appointed Headmaster of the school and held the post for six years. Bogra's native son Babu Kishoree Lal Roy, who is the author of many philosophical writings, was an early student of this school. In his book Free Enquiry after Truth he wrote, “In 1853 a Government English school was established here and I obtained my entrance into it. My progress in this institution has been remarked by its first and best of its Headmasters that ever were, to have been remarkably rapid. Be it said with deep respect and gratitude that under the judicious tuition of Babu Bhagabati Charan Ghosh I obtained a useful knowledge of the English language within about four years and a half. I have always thought Bhahabati Babu to be one of my greatest benefactors on Earth and will think so for ever also.”

There were four teachers during the period of Bhagabati Babu. According to the National School Committee, the school appears to have beeb founded principally by the sons and relatives of the clerks' officers connected with the Courts. After Bhagabati Babu, A. C. Mukharjee became Headmaster in 1859. During his tenure, two students passed in 2nd division, and one passed in 1st division with scholarship in 1862. Around this time, the practice of giving books as rewards to the students of both Bangla and English schools based on their performance was started.

During the prize-giving ceremony more than a hundred taka used to be spent for fireworks. During 1859–60, the inspector of the schools of the north-east areas and Assam, Mr. W. Robinson, conducted the ceremony. He arranged a demonstration with a magic lantern for their entertainment and showed many interesting and educative events of nature such as the motions of the stars and planets, a solar and lunar eclipse, a cyclone, etc. From 1881 to 1885, a school building was constructed of bricks.

In 1873–74, there were six teachers, one pundit, and one moulavi in the school. There were 85 students in 1860–61. In 1907–08, the number of students was 363. Among them, 218 were Hindus and 145 were Muslims.

The school now has 52 faculty members and 2000 students. The faculty members are graduates from universities in Bangladesh, and student applicants, mostly from top elementary schools, are put through a competitive admission selection process.

Location
Bogra Zilla School is located at the center of Bogra city, called Shatmatha. It is the nerve of Bogra town. The Circuit House is situated at the eastern border of the school and a playing ground, named Altafunnesa is situated in the southern border.

Admission
Admission is competitive. Students are admitted into class three. After an initial screening, more than 2500 applicants appear at a comprehensive admission test for only 240 positions. There are a few positions (five to ten) in class four to nine each year.

Academics
This school teaches from class three to class ten. Upon a screening in class ten, students appear at the SSC examination.

Notable alumni
 Humayun Ahmed - novelist and filmmaker
 Muhammad Zafar Iqbal - academician and writer
 Ziaur Rahman - former president of Bangladesh and the founder of Bangladesh Nationalist Party
 Akhteruzzaman Elias - novelist and short story writer
 Mushfiqur Rahim - cricketer and former captain of the national team

See also
 List of Zilla Schools of Bangladesh

References

1853 establishments in India
High schools in Bangladesh
Educational institutions established in 1853
Boys' schools in Bangladesh